Sarkar (also spelt Circar) is a historical administrative division, used mostly in the Mughal Empire. It was a division of a Subah or province. A sarkar was further divided into Mahallas or Parganas.

The Sarkar system was replaced in the early 18th century by the Chakla system.

See also 
 Northern Circars, the five individual districts making up a former division of British India's Madras Presidency
 Rajamundry Sarkar, one among the Northern Circars
 Pakhli, an ancient sarkar now part of Hazara, Pakistan
 Pakhal Sarkar, an area of Mansehra district in Khyber Pakhtunkhwa, Pakistan

References 

Subdivisions of the Mughal Empire
Former subdivisions of Bangladesh